Time's Up may refer to:

Books
 Time's Up (book), a 2010 non-fiction book by Susan Murphy-Milano
 Time's Up, a novel in the Beacon Street Girls series for girls

Music
 Time's Up (Living Colour album), 1990
 Time's Up (K-Solo album), 1992
 Time's Up, by Allure, 2010
 Time's Up, by Buzzcocks, 2000
 Time's Up, by Thee Majesty, 1999
 Time's Up Live, a live DVD by Psychic TV

Songs
 "Time's Up" (Jadakiss song), 2004
 "Time's Up" (Southern Pacific and Carlene Carter song), 1989
 "Time's Up", by Amanda Lear, 1987
 "Time's Up", by Ashley Tisdale from her album Guilty Pleasure, 2009
 "Time's Up", by Living Colour, 1990
 "Time's Up", by OC from the album Word...Life, 1994
 "Time's Up", by Sycco, 2021

Organizations
 Time's Up!, a cycling and environmental advocacy group in New York City
 Time's Up (artist group), an interactive media and machine arts group in Linz, Austria
Time's Up (organization), an organization of Hollywood women to support lower-income women fighting sexual abuse and harassment
Time's Up, a social movement against sexual abuse and harassment that is part of the Me Too movement
Time's Up Legal Defense Fund, an organization that provides legal and media assistance to individuals facing workplace sexual discrimination and harassment

Television
 "Time's Up" (CSI: NY episode)

Games
 Time's Up! (game), a commercial variant of the parlour game Celebrity

See also
 Time Is Up, a 2011 album by Havok